is a Latin phrase, meaning "Let justice be done, though the world perish".

This sentence was the motto of Ferdinand I, Holy Roman Emperor (1556–1564), who used it as his slogan, and it became an important rule to control the nation. It probably originated from Johannes Jacobus Manlius's book  (1563). It is a maxim meaning that a just decision should be made at whatever cost in terms of practical consequences. An alternative phrase is Fiat justitia ruat caelum, meaning "Let justice be done, though the heavens may fall."

A famous use is by Immanuel Kant, in his 1795 Perpetual Peace: A Philosophical Sketch, to summarize the counter-utilitarian nature of his moral philosophy, in the form , which he paraphrases as "Let justice reign even if all the rascals in the world should perish from it."

Ludwig von Mises wrote in Human Action, "The utilitarian economist does not say: Fiat justitia, pereat mundus. He says: Fiat justitia, ne pereat mundus." (=Let Justice be done, so that the world won't perish, or, Let justice be done, and the world not perish).

See also
, a similar phrase

References

16th-century neologisms
Brocards (law)
Latin legal terminology
Latin quotations
Ferdinand I, Holy Roman Emperor
Latin mottos